Ophelina is a genus of annelids belonging to the family Opheliidae.

The genus has cosmopolitan distribution.

Species:

Ophelina abranchiata 
Ophelina abranchiata 
Ophelina acuminata 
Ophelina adamantea 
Ophelina alata 
Ophelina ammotrypanella 
Ophelina aulogastrella 
Ophelina basicirra 
Ophelina bimensis 
Ophelina bowitzi 
Ophelina brattegardi 
Ophelina breviata 
Ophelina brevibranchiata 
Ophelina buitendijki 
Ophelina chaetifera 
Ophelina cirrosa 
Ophelina cordiformis 
Ophelina curli 
Ophelina cylindricaudata 
Ophelina cyprophilia 
Ophelina delapidans 
Ophelina dubia
Ophelina ehlersi 
Ophelina fauveli 
Ophelina ganae 
Ophelina gaucha 
Ophelina gigantea 
Ophelina grandis 
Ophelina groenlandica 
Ophelina gymnopyge 
Ophelina hachaensis 
Ophelina helgolandiae 
Ophelina juhazi 
Ophelina kampeni 
Ophelina kinbergii 
Ophelina kohni 
Ophelina kuekenthali 
Ophelina kuekenthali 
Ophelina langii 
Ophelina longicaudata 
Ophelina longicirrata 
Ophelina manana 
Ophelina martinezarbizui 
Ophelina meyerae 
Ophelina minima 
Ophelina modesta 
Ophelina nematoides 
Ophelina norvegica 
Ophelina nunnallyi 
Ophelina opisthobranchiata 
Ophelina pallida
Ophelina profunda 
Ophelina pygocirrata 
Ophelina remigera 
Ophelina robusta 
Ophelina scaphigera 
Ophelina setigera 
Ophelina sibogae 
Ophelina syringopyge 
Ophelina tessellata

References

Polychaetes
Polychaete genera